Sarah Bache  (1771? – 23 July 1844), was an English hymn writer. She was born at Bromsgrove, but brought up at Worcester by relatives named Laugher, members of the Rev. Thomas Belsham's congregation. Rev. Timothy Laugher, of Hackney (d. 1769), was her uncle, and she was a cousin of Joshua Tilt Bache.

She moved to Birmingham (before 1791, for she had attended the ministry of Joseph Priestley) and for many years kept the Islington School, in conjunction with a half-sister, Miss Penn. Another half-sister, Anna Penn, married the Rev. Lant Carpenter, LL.D. She was the author of the hymn See how he loved, which first appeared in the Exeter collection in 1812, compiled by Dr. Carpenter. She died at Birmingham on 23 July 1844, at. 74.

See also
English women hymnwriters (18th to 19th-century)

 Eliza Sibbald Alderson
 Augusta Amherst Austen
 Charlotte Alington Barnard
 Sarah Doudney
 Charlotte Elliott
 Ada R. Habershon
 Katherine Hankey
 Frances Ridley Havergal
 Maria Grace Saffery
 Anne Steele
 Emily Taylor
 Emily H. Woodmansee

References

Attribution

English hymnwriters
1770s births
1844 deaths
People from Bromsgrove
British women hymnwriters